"Peace in Our Time" is a song written by English songwriters Andy Hill and Peter Sinfield, first recorded by American actress Jennifer Holliday for the 1988 Summer Olympics album One Moment in Time. The song was later covered by American rock singer Eddie Money and English singer Cliff Richard.

Eddie Money version 

Eddie Money released his version as a single in 1989 and included it on his album Greatest Hits: The Sound of Money. The single debuted on the US Billboard Hot 100 chart on 2 December 1989, and reached a peak of number 11. It also reached number two on the Billboard Album Rock Tracks chart and number 34 on the Billboard Adult Contemporary chart. In Canada, "Peace in Our Time" reached number three.

Charts

Weekly charts

Year-end charts

Cliff Richard version 

In 1993, British singer Cliff Richard released a cover of "Peace in Our Time" as the second single from his 31st studio album, The Album (1993). The song peaked at number eight on the UK Singles Chart.

Critical reception 
Alan Jones from Music Week gave Richard's version of the song three out of five, writing, "The Chamberlain-esque title conceals a commercial single penned by Andy Hill and Peter Sinfield, who wrote many of Bucks Fizz's finest. Upbeat, well sung and hopeful, with bounding, club-friendly Harding/Curnow mixes."

Charts

References 

Eddie Money songs
1988 songs
1989 singles
Columbia Records singles
Songs with lyrics by Peter Sinfield
Songs written by Andy Hill (composer)